Maryland's Legislative District 37 is one of 47 districts in the state for the Maryland General Assembly. It covers Talbot County, Maryland and parts of Caroline County, Dorchester County and Wicomico County. The district is divided into two sub-districts for the Maryland House of Delegates: District 37A and District 37B.

Demographic characteristics
As of the 2020 United States census, the district had a population of 127,669, of whom 100,275 (78.5%) were of voting age. The racial makeup of the district was 80,393 (63.0%) White, 32,394 (25.4%) African American, 508 (0.4%) Native American, 1,921 (1.5%) Asian, 22 (0.0%) Pacific Islander, 4,776 (3.7%) from some other race, and 7,641 (6.0%) from two or more races. Hispanic or Latino of any race were 8,839 (6.9%) of the population.

The district had 87,257 registered voters as of October 17, 2020, of whom 15,252 (17.5%) were registered as unaffiliated, 33,926 (38.9%) were registered as Republicans, 36,814 (42.2%) were registered as Democrats, and 736 (0.8%) were registered to other parties.

Political representation
The district is represented for the 2023–2027 legislative term in the State Senate by John F. Mautz IV (R) and in the House of Delegates by Sheree Sample-Hughes (D, District 37A), Christopher T. Adams (R, District 37B) and Tom Hutchinson (R, District 37B).

History

1994 redistricting
On January 14, 1994, Maryland was ordered to submit a plan for a new African American majority district on the Eastern Shore following Marylanders for Fair Representation, Inc. v. Schaefer. The U.S. District Court approved a plan to alter the boundaries of former legislative districts 36, 37, and 38, beginning with the 1994 general election. Following this, parts of Caroline County, Dorchester County, Talbot County and Wicomico County were provisioned for district 37.

References

Talbot County, Maryland
Caroline County, Maryland
Dorchester County, Maryland
Wicomico County, Maryland
37